Odri is a village in the municipality of Tearce, North Macedonia.

Demographics
According to the 2002 census, the village had a total of 1739 inhabitants. Ethnic groups in the village include:

Albanians 1598
Macedonians 139
Serbs 2

References

External links

Villages in Tearce Municipality
Albanian communities in North Macedonia